Adenostyles is a genus of flowering plants in the sunflower family Asteraceae, and of the tribe Senecioneae. It was described as a genus in 1816. Adenostyles occur in the temperate climates of the northern hemisphere, mainly in Europe and Asia Minor.

Adenostyles includes species that were considered to belong to the genus Cacalia. The term was used in 1883 for a genus of Orchidaceae.

Species

, Plants of the World online has 6 accepted species:

Selected hybrids include:
 Adenostyles × canescens 
 Adenostyles × eginensis 

Selected synonyms include:
 Adenostyles macrophylla  — synonym of Caucasalia macrophylla 
 Adenostyles platyphylloides  — synonym of  Caucasalia pontica 
 Adenostyles rhombifolia  — synonym of Caucasalia macrophylla 
 Adenostyles similiflorus  — synonym of Caucasalia similiflora

References

External links

Senecioneae
Asteraceae genera